Ziya Alkurt (born 26 September 1990) is a Turkish professional footballer who plays as a forward for Menemenspor.

Professional career
Alkurt spent most of his early career in the lower leagues in Turkey, before joining Kayserispor on 4 July 2019. Alkurt made his professional debut with Kayserispor in a 1-0 Süper Lig loss to Alanyaspor on 17 August 2019.

References

External links
 
 

1990 births
People from Trabzon Province
Living people
Turkish footballers
Association football forwards
1461 Trabzon footballers
Bayrampaşaspor footballers
Orduspor footballers
Giresunspor footballers
Denizlispor footballers
Kayserispor footballers
Altay S.K. footballers
Ankara Keçiörengücü S.K. footballers
Menemenspor footballers
Süper Lig players
TFF First League players
TFF Second League players
TFF Third League players